Season of the Witch is the 25th album released by Nox Arcana on October 1, 2017. The theme centers around a coven of witches that gather each Halloween night at place called "Raven's Hollow", which is a setting mentioned in the book series The Dark Tower by Joseph Vargo. The first track features a narration that sounds like an old woman casting a spell, which continues later in the bonus track. The music features piano, harpsichord, drums, symbols, tolling bells and violins, with vocal choirs.

Track list 
 The Witching Hour - 2:13
 Autumn Dusk - 2:57
 Bell, Book and Candle - 3:34
 Shadow Dance - 3:19
 The Path Of No Return - 3:41
 Gypsy Spell - 3:10
 Spirits In The Mist - 3:17
 Dark Powers - 3:53
 Warlock's Wake - 2:44
 Malleus Maleficarum - 2:52
 Witch Hunters - 2:50
 From The Ashes - 3:11
 The Haunted Forest - 2:55
 Raven's Hollow - 3:50
 Black Cauldron - 2:57
 Unpleasant Dreams - 3:18
 Book Of Shadows - 4:22
 Mystic Circle - 3:40
 Sabbat Night - 2:50
 Ritual Of Fire - 3:17
 Season Of The Witch - 5:22

References

External links 
 

Nox Arcana albums
Halloween albums
2017 albums